Sotamaa is a surname. Notable people with the surname include:

 Antero Sotamaa (born 1940), Finnish sailor
 Yrjö Sotamaa (born 1942), Finnish designer and design strategist

Finnish-language surnames